Rugby in New Zealand may refer to:

Rugby league

Rugby league in New Zealand (main article)
New Zealand national rugby league team
New Zealand Rugby League, the format for rugby league in New Zealand
List of New Zealand rugby league clubs

Rugby union

Rugby union in New Zealand (main article)
New Zealand Rugby Union, the federation
All Blacks (the national team)
New Zealand Māori rugby union team
Black Ferns (the NZ women's national team)

Rugby union in New Zealand
Rugby league in New Zealand